Melaleuca camptoclada is a shrub in the myrtle family, Myrtaceae and is endemic to the south-west of Western Australia. It was first described in 1990 in a review of the genus Melaleuca when the species Melaleuca laxiflora at that time was found to comprise ten species. Two of those species were new - M. camptoclada and M. ctenoides.

Description
Its leaves and branches are glabrous or almost so.

The stamens are arranged in five bundles around the flower with 9 to 16 stamens in each bundle.

Taxonomy and naming
Melaleuca camptoclada was first formally described in 1990 by F.C.Quinn from a specimen found near the Stirling Ranges. The specific epithet (camptoclada) is from the Greek camptos, (flexible or curved) and clados (a shoot or branch), referring to the habit of this species.

Distribution and habitat
This melaleuca occurs in the Esperance Plains, Jarrah Forest and Warren biogeographic regions. It grows in gravelly sand and clay loam.

Conservation status
Melaleuca camptoclada is listed as "not threatened" by the Government of Western Australia Department of Parks and Wildlife.

References

camptoclada
Plants described in 1990
Myrtales of Australia
Endemic flora of Western Australia